Gökhan Birben is a Turkish singer and artist of Hamsheni descent.

Birben attended school in Rize until graduating from high school. After graduating at the age of 17, he ended up in Istanbul where he attended the Istanbul University State Conservatory. Upon joining the Ladikoy Moda Musical Association, he began training in Turkish classical music, but Birben is yet to adapt this style of music. He became interested in football and played for two years as a member of the Fenerbahçe youth team. He has also worked as a radio reporter.

Birben released his first album in 2003, Hey Gidi Karadeniz. The language of the songs are Homshetsi and Laz.

Albums 

Hey Gidi Karadeniz (26 March 2003)
 Hey Gidi Karadeniz
 Oy Oy Güzelum
 Liligum (Sevdiğim)
 İzgali-na (Gittin)
 Havaz Ali Mevalezt (Hava Yine Bulutlandı)
 Atma türkü
 Khacivanag
 Dumanlı Dağlar
 Akar Hemşin Deresi
 Gidiyorum Yayladan
 Kar Yağar Karamişa
 Yüreğim Senilendur

Asa Sevdam (11 May 2005)
 Karadeniz Karasun
 Yüksek Dağlara Kar Var
 Tulumci
 Alacalı kuş
 Asiye
 Derrule
 Oy Dağlarum
 Divane Aşık Gibi
 Haba
 Asa Sevdam
 Sis Dağı
 Dere Beni Boğamaz
 Haso Cernozutes

Bir Türkü Ömrüme (20 December 2006)
 Bir Türkü Ömrüme
 Oy Puşilim
 Heyya Heyya
 Ey Mustafa
 Osmanum
 Kız Hamsiye
 Nazlı Yar
 Hele Mele
 Nani Nani
 Tun Sari Mazed Sari
 Ahmedum

Bulutların Gözyaşı (7 July 2011)
Samistal
Üskürt Dağı
Bulutların Gözyaşı
Omuzumda Orağum
Karayemiş
Vaketisa Düzebi
Analigum
Hey Gidi Karli Dağlar
Punipos
Zurpicine Ağhçkenin
Ağustozi Mulun
Verane Kalsun Dağlar

Sources 

Turkish people of Hemshin descent
Turkish musicians
Living people
Year of birth missing (living people)